The Dunning–Kruger effect is a cognitive bias whereby people with low ability, expertise, or experience regarding a certain type of task or area of knowledge tend to overestimate their ability or knowledge. Some researchers also include the opposite effect for high performers: their tendency to underestimate their skills. In popular culture, the Dunning–Kruger effect is often misunderstood as a claim about general overconfidence of people with low intelligence instead of specific overconfidence of people unskilled at a particular task.

The Dunning–Kruger effect is usually measured by comparing self-assessment with a measure of objective performance. For example, the participants in a study may be asked to complete a quiz and then estimate how well they performed. This subjective assessment is then compared with how well they actually performed. This can happen in either relative or absolute terms, i.e., in comparison with one's peer group as the percentage of peers outperformed or in comparison with objective standards as the number of questions answered correctly. The Dunning–Kruger effect appears in both cases, but is more pronounced in relative terms; the bottom quartile of performers tend to see themselves as being part of the top two quartiles. 
The initial study was published by David Dunning and Justin Kruger in 1999. It focused on logical reasoning, grammar, and social skills. Since then various other studies have been conducted across a wide range of tasks, including skills from fields such as business, politics, medicine, driving, aviation, spatial memory, examinations in school, and literacy.

Many models have been suggested to explain the Dunning-Kruger effect's underlying causes. The original model by Dunning and Kruger holds that a lack of metacognitive abilities is responsible. This interpretation is based on the idea that poor performers have not yet acquired the ability to distinguish between good and bad performances. They tend to overrate themselves because they do not see the qualitative difference between their performances and the performances of others. This has also been termed the "dual-burden account" since the lack of skill is paired with the ignorance of this deficiency. Some researchers include the metacognitive component as part of the definition of the Dunning–Kruger effect and not just as an explanation distinct from it. Various researchers have criticized the metacognitive model and proposed alternative explanations. According to the statistical model, a statistical effect known as regression toward the mean together with the cognitive bias known as the better-than-average effect are responsible for the empirical findings. The rational model holds that overly positive prior beliefs about one's skills are the source of false self-assessment. Another explanation claims that self-assessment is more difficult and error-prone for low performers because many of them have very similar skill levels. Another model sees lack of incentive to give accurate self-assessments as the source of error.

The Dunning–Kruger effect has been described as relevant for various practical matters, but disagreements exist about the magnitude of its influence. Inaccurate self-assessment can lead people to make bad decisions, such as choosing a career for which they are unfit or engaging in dangerous behavior. It may also inhibit the affected from addressing their shortcomings to improve themselves. In some cases, the associated overconfidence may have positive side effects, like increasing motivation and energy.

Definition 
The Dunning–Kruger effect is defined as the tendency of people with low ability in a specific area to give overly positive assessments of this ability. This is often understood as a cognitive bias, i.e. as a systematic tendency to engage in erroneous forms of thinking and judging. In the case of the Dunning–Kruger effect, this applies mainly to people with low skill in a specific area trying to evaluate their competence within this area. The systematic error concerns their tendency to greatly overestimate their competence, i.e. to see themselves as more skilled than they are.

The Dunning–Kruger effect is usually defined specifically for the self-assessments of people with a low level of competence. But some theorists do not restrict it to the bias of people with low skill, also discussing the reverse effect, i.e., the tendency of highly skilled people to underestimate their abilities relative to the abilities of others. In this case, the source of the error may not be the self-assessment of one's skills, but an overly positive assessment of the skills of others. This phenomenon can be understood as a form of the false-consensus effect, i.e., the tendency to "overestimate the extent to which other people share one's beliefs, attitudes, and behaviours".

Some researchers include a metacognitive component in their definition. In this view, the Dunning–Kruger effect is the thesis that those who are incompetent in a given area tend to be ignorant of their incompetence, i.e., they lack the metacognitive ability to become aware of their incompetence. This definition lends itself to a simple explanation of the effect: incompetence often includes being unable to tell the difference between competence and incompetence, which is why it is difficult for the incompetent to recognize their incompetence. This is sometimes termed the "dual-burden" account, since low performers are affected by two burdens: they lack a skill and they are unaware of this deficiency. Other definitions focus on the tendency to overestimate one's ability and see the relation to metacognition as a possible explanation that is not part of the definition. This distinction is relevant since the metacognitive explanation is controversial and various criticisms of the Dunning–Kruger effect target this explanation while accepting the empirical findings that low performers tend to overestimate their skills.

Among laypeople, the Dunning–Kruger effect is often misunderstood as the claim that people with low intelligence are more confident in their knowledge and skills than people with high intelligence. In this regard, it has been interpreted as the claim that "stupid people are too stupid to know they are stupid". But the Dunning–Kruger effect applies not to intelligence in general but to skills in specific tasks. Nor does it claim that people lacking a given skill are as confident as high performers. Rather, low performers overestimate themselves but their confidence level is still below that of high performers.

Measurement, analysis, and investigated tasks 

The most common approach to measuring the Dunning–Kruger effect is to compare self-assessment with objective performance. The self-assessment is sometimes called subjective ability in contrast to the objective ability corresponding to the actual performance. The self-assessment may be done before or after the performance. If done afterward, the participants receive no independent clues during the performance as to how well they did. Thus, if the activity involves answering quiz questions, no feedback is given as to whether a given answer was correct. The measurement of the subjective and the objective abilities can be in absolute or relative terms. When done in absolute terms, self-assessment and performance are measured according to objective standards, e.g. concerning how many quiz questions were answered correctly. When done in relative terms, the results are compared with a peer group. In this case, participants are asked to assess their performances in relation to the other participants, for example in the form of estimating the percentage of peers they outperformed. The Dunning–Kruger effect is present in both cases, but tends to be significantly more pronounced when done in relative terms. This means that people are usually more accurate when predicting their raw score than when assessing how well they did relative to their peer group.

The main point of interest for researchers is usually the correlation between subjective and objective ability. To provide a simplified form of analysis of the measurements, objective performances are often divided into four groups, starting from the bottom quartile of low performers to the top quartile of high performers. The strongest effect is seen for the participants in the bottom quartile, who tend to see themselves as being part of the top two quartiles when measured in relative terms.

The initial study by David Dunning and Justin Kruger examines the performance and self-assessment of undergraduate students in the fields of inductive, deductive, and abductive logical reasoning, English grammar, and appreciation of humor. Across four studies, the research indicates that the participants who scored in the bottom quartile overestimated their test performance and their abilities; despite test scores that placed them in the 12th percentile, the participants estimated they ranked in the 62nd percentile. Other studies focus on how a person's self-view causes inaccurate self-assessments. Some studies indicate that the extent of the inaccuracy depends on the type of task and can be improved by becoming a better performer. 

Overall, the Dunning–Kruger effect has been studied across a wide range of tasks. They include fields like business, politics, medicine, driving skills, aviation, spatial memory, literacy, debating skills, and chess. Many studies focus on students, for example as they self-assess their performance after completing an exam. In some cases, these studies gather and compare data from many countries. Most of the studies are conducted in laboratories, but the effect has also been investigated in other settings. Examples include assessing the knowledge hunters have of firearms and large-scale online surveys.

Explanations 
Various theorists have tried to provide models to explain the Dunning-Kruger effect's underlying causes. The original explanation by Dunning and Kruger holds that a lack of metacognitive abilities is responsible. This interpretation is not universally accepted, and many alternative explanations are discussed in the academic literature. Some of them focus only on one specific factor, while others see a combination of various factors as the cause.

Metacognitive 
The metacognitive explanation rests on the idea that part of acquiring a skill consists in learning to distinguish between good and bad performances of the skill. It assumes that people of low skill level are unable to properly assess their performance because they have not yet acquired the discriminatory ability to do so. This leads them to believe that they are better than they actually are because they do not see the qualitative difference between their performance and that of others. In this regard, they lack the metacognitive ability to recognize their incompetence. This model has also been called the "dual-burden account" or the "double-burden of incompetence", since the burden of regular incompetence is paired with the burden of metacognitive incompetence. The metacognitive lack may hinder some people from becoming better by hiding their flaws from them. This can then be used to explain how self-confidence is sometimes higher for unskilled people than for people with an average skill: only the latter are aware of their flaws. Some attempts have been made to measure metacognitive abilities directly to investigate this hypothesis. Some findings suggest that poor performers have reduced metacognitive sensitivity, but it is not clear that its extent is sufficient to explain the Dunning–Kruger effect. Another study concludes that unskilled people lack information but that their metacognitive processes have the same quality as those of skilled people. An indirect argument for the metacognitive model is based on the observation that training people in logical reasoning helps them make more accurate self-assessments. Many criticisms of the metacognitive model hold that it has insufficient empirical evidence and that alternative models offer a better explanation.

Statistical 

A different interpretation is further removed from the psychological level and sees the Dunning–Kruger effect as mainly a statistical artifact. It is based on the idea that the statistical effect known as regression toward the mean explains the empirical findings. This effect happens when two variables are not perfectly correlated: if one picks a sample that has an extreme value for one variable, it tends to show a less extreme value for the other variable. For the Dunning-Kruger effect, the two variables are actual performance and self-assessed performance. If a person with low actual performance is selected, their self-assessed performance tends to be higher.

Most researchers acknowledge that regression toward the mean is a relevant statistical effect that must be taken into account when interpreting the empirical findings. This can be achieved by various methods. Some theorists, like Gilles Gignac and Marcin Zajenkowski, go further and argue that regression toward the mean in combination with other cognitive biases, like the better-than-average effect, can explain most of the empirical findings. This type of explanation is sometimes called "noise plus bias". According to the better-than-average effect, people generally tend to rate their abilities, attributes, and personality traits as better than average. For example, the average IQ is 100, but people on average think their IQ is 115. The better-than-average effect differs from the Dunning–Kruger effect since it does not track how this overly positive outlook relates to the skill of the people assessing themselves, while the Dunning–Kruger effect mainly focuses on how this type of misjudgment happens for poor performers. When the better-than-average effect is paired with regression toward the mean, it can explain both that unskilled people tend to greatly overestimate their competence and that the reverse effect for highly skilled people is much less pronounced. This can be shown using simulated experiments that have almost the same correlation between objective and self-assessed ability as actual experiments. Some critics of this model have argued that it can explain the Dunning–Kruger effect only when assessing one's ability relative to one's peer group, not when the self-assessment is relative to an objective standard. A different objection claims that seeing the Dunning–Kruger effect as a regression toward the mean is only a form of relabeling the problem and does not explain what mechanism causes the regression.

Rational 
The rational model of the Dunning–Kruger effect explains the observed regression toward the mean not as a statistical artifact but as the result of prior beliefs. If low performers expect to perform well, this can cause them to give an overly positive self-assessment. This model uses a psychological interpretation that differs from the metacognitive explanation since the error is caused by overly positive prior beliefs and not by the inability to correctly assess oneself. For example, after answering a ten-question quiz, a low performer with only four correct answers may believe they got two questions right and five questions wrong, while they are unsure about the remaining three. Because of their positive prior beliefs, they will automatically assume that they got these three remaining questions right and thereby overestimate their performance.

Distribution of high and low performers 
Another model sees the way high and low performers are distributed as the source of erroneous self-assessment. It is based on the assumption that many low performers' skill levels are very similar, i.e., that "many people [are] piled up at the bottom rungs of skill level". This would make it much more difficult for them to accurately assess their skills in relation to their peers. According to this model, the reason for the increased tendency to give false self-assessments is not a lack of metacognitive ability but a more challenging situation in which this ability is applied. One criticism of this interpretation is directed against the assumption that this type of distribution of skill levels can always be used as an explanation. While it can be found in various fields where the Dunning–Kruger effect has been researched, it is not present in all of them. Another criticism holds that this model can explain the Dunning–Kruger effect only when the self-assessment is measured relative to one's peer group but not when it is measured relative to absolute standards.

Lack of incentive 
A further explanation, sometimes given by theorists with an economic background, focuses on the fact that participants in the corresponding studies lack incentive to give accurate self-assessments. In such cases, intellectual laziness or a desire to look good to the experimenter may motivate participants to give overly positive self-assessments. For this reason, some studies were conducted with additional incentives to be accurate. One study gave participants a monetary reward based on how accurate their self-assessments were. These studies failed to show any significant increase in accuracy for the incentive group in contrast to the control group.

Significance 
Various claims have been made about the Dunning–Kruger effect's practical significance or why it matters. They often focus on how it causes the affected people to make decisions that lead to dire consequences for them or others. This is especially relevant for decisions that have long-term effects. For example, it can lead poor performers into careers for which they are unfit. High performers underestimating their skills, though, may forego viable career opportunities matching their skills in favor of less promising ones that are below their skill level. In other cases, the wrong decisions can also have severe short-term effects, as when overconfidence leads pilots to operate a new aircraft for which they lack adequate training or to engage in flight maneuvers that exceed their proficiency. Emergency medicine is another area where the correct assessment of one's skills and the risks of treatment is of central importance. The tendencies of physicians in training to be overconfident must be considered to ensure the appropriate degree of supervision and feedback. The Dunning–Kruger effect can also affect economic activities negatively. This is the case, for example, when the price of a good, such as a used car, is lowered by the buyers' uncertainty about its quality. An overconfident buyer unaware of their lack of knowledge may be willing to pay a much higher price because they do not take into account all the potential flaws and risks relevant to the price.

Another implication concerns fields in which self-assessments play an essential role in evaluating skills. They are commonly used, for example, in vocational counseling or to estimate the information literacy skills of students and professionals. The Dunning–Kruger effect indicates that such self-assessments often do not correspond to the underlying skills, thereby rendering them unreliable as a method for gathering this type of data. Independent of the field of the skill in question, the metacognitive ignorance often associated with the Dunning–Kruger effect may inhibit low performers from improving themselves. Since they are unaware of many of their flaws, they may have little motivation to address and overcome them.

Not all accounts of the Dunning–Kruger effect focus on its negative sides. Some also concentrate on its positive sides, e.g. that ignorance is sometimes bliss. In this sense, optimism can lead people to experience their situation more positively, and overconfidence may help them achieve even unrealistic goals. To distinguish the negative from the positive sides, two important phases have been suggested to be relevant for realizing a goal: preparatory planning and the execution of the plan. Overconfidence may be beneficial in the execution phase by increasing motivation and energy, but it can be detrimental in the planning phase since the agent may ignore bad odds, take unnecessary risks, or fail to prepare for contingencies. For example, being overconfident may be advantageous for a general on the day of battle because of the additional inspiration passed on to his troops, but disadvantageous in the weeks before by ignoring the need for reserve troops or protective gear.

In 2000, Kruger and Dunning were awarded the satirical Ig Nobel Prize in recognition of the scientific work recorded in "their modest report".

See also

 
 
 
 
 
 
 
 
 
 
 
 
  – Passing judgment beyond one's expertise

References

Citations

Sources

Further reading

External links

Cognitive biases
Cognitive inertia
Incompetence